The Fiat 666 was a heavy truck produced by the Italian Fiat Veicoli Industriali.

History 
The 666, like the corresponding medium-sized Fiat 626, was produced from 1940 as "Unified" truck: since 1937, by law, the War Department required all manufacturers of civilian trucks to have standard features regarding weight, number of axles, speed and capacity, in order to simplify logistics in case of requisition by the armed forces.
The 626 and the 666, which replaced on assembly lines, respectively, the Fiat 621 and Fiat 632, were the first trucks of the Turin with forward control, and with the engine totally contained inside the cabin.
The chassis was made of longitudinal members on two axels, with front-wheel steering and twin rear-wheel drive, and a wheelbase and track width of 3.85 meters by 1.84 meters. The truck had a Fiat 366, 6-cylinder 9365 cc, diesel engine, which developed 105 hp at 2000 rpm and was characterized by its innovative layout of guides that allowed a quick and simple replacement from the front. The gearbox had 4 forward speeds and one reverse speed with reduction gearing. Externally, it differed from the Fiat 626 only in size, the shape of the windscreen and the body. The trailers, with 6260 kg capacity (twice the 626), could carry 20 equipped soldiers.

The vehicle was produced from 1940 to 1945 in civil and NM (Nafta Military) 666N diesel versions (nafta) for the armed forces. In 1943, the BM version gasoline was approved for military use, but the armistice prevented production.

The civilian version, also available with a bus chassis, had enormous success, also being produced after the war as the Fiat 666N7, for a total production of 8000.

Military use 
The Fiat 666 was largely acquired by the Italian armed forces: the N-RE version for the Royal Italian Army and the N-RA for the Royal Italian Air Force were captured in different outfits, such as the Bus, Car, Tanker, Fire Engine, Transport quadrupeds, with portacarri trailers Viberti and Bartoletti. After the Armistice of Cassibile 79 NM were produced for the Germans who occupied the Fiat facilities in north Italy. Among the units supplied to the forces of the Italian Social Republic, there is evidence of at least one 666 armored, handcrafted from the arsenal of Piacenza, with a turret armed with a 12.7 mm Breda-SAFAT machine gun and supplied to the Republican National Guard.

Fiat 665NM 
In 1941 a military-wheel drive version of Fiat 666NM diesel was produced. The vehicle maintained maximum commonality with rear-wheel drive versions and went into production for the

armed forces in 1942. After the armistice, 2 copies were be produced for the Wehrmacht.

In 1942 an armoured personnel carrier version was made, called Fiat 665NM protected or shielded, used against Yugoslav partisans first, and then in northern Italy.

Technical features

Bibliography 
 Gli Autoveicoli tattici e logistici del Regio Esercito Italiano fino al 1943, vol. II, Stato Maggiore dell'Esercito, Ufficio Storico, Nicola Pignato e Filippo Cappellano, 2005.
 Gli Autoveicoli del Regio Esercito nella Seconda Guerra Mondiale, Nicola Pignato, Storia Militare.

See also 
 Fiat 665NM protetto
 Fiat 626
 Fiat 632

External links 

666
World War II vehicles of Italy
Military trucks of Italy
Military vehicles introduced from 1940 to 1944